The Tenth Amendment of the Constitution of South Africa altered the provisions relating to membership of the National Assembly and the provincial legislatures, to allow members of those bodies to cross the floor (move from one party to another) at certain times without losing their seats. It came into force on 20 March 2003, and was effectively repealed on 17 March 2009 by the Fourteenth and Fifteenth Amendments.

Provisions
The amendment renumbered the constitution's existing Schedule 6A (inserted by the Eighth Amendment and dealing with municipal floor-crossing) to Schedule 6B, and inserted a new Schedule 6A, entitled "Retention of membership of National Assembly or provincial legislature, after a change of party membership, mergers between parties, subdivision of parties and subdivision and merger of parties". This schedule allowed MPs and MPLs to cross the floor without losing their seats, but only during certain window periods. Representatives could also only cross the floor if at least one-tenth of the representatives of the party they were leaving did so during the same period.

The permitted floor-crossing periods for were to occur from the first to the fifteenth of September in the second and fourth years after each election of the legislature; such elections occur every five years. One was also to occur in the fifteen days immediately after the amendment came into force. The floor-crossing periods that occurred before repeal were therefore 21 March–4 April 2003, 1–15 September 2005, and 1–15 September 2007.

Legislative history
Parliament had previously attempted to allow floor-crossing by passing the Loss or Retention of Membership of National and Provincial Legislatures Act, 2002, an ordinary act rather than a constitutional amendment. On 4 October 2002, in the case of United Democratic Movement v President of the Republic of South Africa and Others, the Constitutional Court declared it to be unconstitutional. A week later a draft of the Constitution of the Republic of South Africa Fourth Amendment Bill was published.

The bill was passed by the National Assembly on 25 February 2003 with 300 votes in favour, more than the required two-thirds majority. It was then passed by the National Council of Provinces on 18 March, with all nine provinces voting in favour. It was signed by President Thabo Mbeki on 19 March, and came into force on the following day.

The changes made by the Tenth Amendment were repealed on 17 April 2009 by the Fourteenth and Fifteenth Amendments.

Formal title
The official short title of the amendment is "Constitution Tenth Amendment Act of 2003". It was originally titled "Constitution of the Republic of South Africa Amendment Act, 2003" and numbered as Act No. 2 of 2003, but the Citation of Constitutional Laws Act, 2005 renamed it and abolished the practice of giving Act numbers to constitutional amendments.

References

External links

 Official text (PDF)

Amendments of the Constitution of South Africa
2003 in South African law